A wat is a type of Buddhist temple and Hindu temple in Cambodia, Laos, East Shan State, Yunnan, the Southern Province of Sri Lanka and Thailand. The word wat is a Thai word that was borrowed from Sanskrit vāṭa (Devanāgarī: वाट), meaning 'enclosure'. The term has varying meanings in each region, sometimes referring to a specific type of government-recognised or large temple, other times referring to any Buddhist or Hindu temple.

Overview 

Strictly speaking, a wat is a Buddhist sacred precinct with vihara, a temple, an edifice housing a large image of Buddha and a facility for lessons. A site without a minimum of three resident bhikkhus cannot correctly be described as a wat although the term is frequently used more loosely, even for ruins of ancient temples. As a transitive or intransitive verb, wat means to measure, to take measurements; compare templum, from which temple derives, having the same root as template.

In Cambodia, a wat is any place of worship. "Wat" generally refers to a Buddhist place of worship, but the precise term is vôtt pŭtthsasnéa meaning "Buddhist pagoda". "Angkor Wat" means 'city of temples'.

In everyday language in Thailand, a "wat" is any place of worship except a mosque (or) or a synagogue. Thus, a wat chin or san chao is a Chinese temple (either Buddhist or Taoist), wat khaek or thewasathan is a Hindu temple and bot khrit or wat farang is a Christian church, though Thai  may be used descriptively as with mosques.

Types 

According to Thai law, there are two types of Thai Buddhist temples:
 Wats (วัด; wat) are temples which have been endorsed by the state and have been granted wisungkhammasima (วิสุงคามสีมา), or the land for establishing central hall, by the king. These temples are divided into:  
 Royal temples: established or patronised by the king or his family members.
 Public temples: established by private citizens. Despite the term "private", private temples are open to the public and are sites of public religious activities.
 Samnak song: are temples without state endorsement and wisungkhamasima.

Structure 

A typical Buddhist wat consists of the following buildings:
Bell tower
 Bot or ubosot (from Pali uposatha) or sim: the holiest prayer room, also called the "ordination hall" as it is where new monks take their vows. Architecturally it is similar to the vihara. The main difference is the eight cornerstones placed around the bot to ward off evil. The bot is usually more decorated than the wihan. In Cambodia nowadays, this type of building is considered to be Vihear. It was previously called Ubaosathakea or Rorng Ubaosoth.
 Chedei or Chedi from Sanskrit: chaitya, temple or that: It is also known as a stupa. Usually conical or bell-shaped buildings, but many Cambodian stupas are constructed in the style of temple shrine. They often contain relics of Buddha. The urns containing the ashes of the cremated dead are kept here and serve as memorials for those ancestors. 
 Chantakhara: a room in which fire and water are kept.
Drum tower
 Hong Song Nam: toilet.
 Ho trai: library where Buddhist texts are kept.
 Kappapiya Kudi utility and storage room.
 Kod, Kut, Kutti, Kuti or Kati: the living quarters of monks (bhikkhus) separated from the sacred buildings.
 Mondop (from Sanskrit: Mandapa): usually an open, square building with four arches and a pyramidal roof, used to worship religious texts or objects.
 Pond ( - Srah;  Sa Nam;  Sa Nam): is rectangular in shape and sometimes decorated with lotus flowers, the emblematic flower of Buddhism. In addition, some wats illustrate the figure of Buddha being sheltered by a seven headed naga, named Mucalinda, in the middle of the pond. The pond itself is called Mucalinda Pond. 
 Sala (from the Sanskrit word  (IAST: śālā), cognate of Hindi शाल, meaning hall, large room or shed. A pavilion for relaxation and miscellaneous activities. In Cambodia, the sala also serves as the Buddhist educational center in a wat, but not every wat has one. It can be found outside the wat proper.
 Oupadthan Sala or Sala Bonn or Sala Wat: a hall for people gathering together to make a donation or for ceremonies. 
 Sala Baley or Sala Putthikakseksa: literally means 'Pali school' or 'Buddhist educational school', is the place to teach Buddhist Dharma and other subjects in both Pali and Khmer languages. Sala Baley is divided into three levels. They are: Buddhist elementary school ( Putthikakpathamaseksa); Buddhist high school ( - Putthikakvityealay); and Buddhist university ( Putthikaksakalvityealay). Beside Buddhist Dharma, Buddhist university includes subjects such as philosophy, science, information technology, Sanskrit, and other foreign languages. These schools may be constructed outside the wat and laypersons are also permitted to study there.
 Sala Chhann, Sala Bat, or Ho Chan: cafeteria for monks.
 Sala Chhatean, Sala Klang Yan or Sala Rong Tham: is usually smaller than other halls and can be built outside the wat, especially along the roads or even in the center of villages. It is used to celebrate Buddhist events as well as for dining and relaxation. 
 Sala Kan Parian or Ho Chaek: study hall, 
 Sala Song: the room where monks receive holy water blessings.
 Sala Thormmasaphear or Thormmasala, Sala Fang Tham: Dharma assembly pavilion, however some assume this hall to be Sala Bonn. 
 Sala Tha Nam: pier pavilion.
 Vihear or wihan from Sanskrit: vihara: a meeting and prayer room.
 Wachak Kod or Watcha Kudi or than : toilet.

Almost all Buddhist temples in Cambodia were built in Khmer architectural style. Most temples were finely decorated with a spiked tower (bosbok)(some temples have three or five spiked towers; some have none) on the rooftop along with pediments, naga heads, and chovear (a decorative ridge-piece that is placed at each topmost edge of the roof, just above the tip of each pediment). Below the edge of the roof and at the top of external columns, garuda or kinnari figures are depicted supporting the roof. There are a pair of guardian lions and one head or several (three, five, seven, or nine). naga sculptures are beside each entrance of the temple. Inside the main temple (vihara) and the multipurpose hall (lunch hall), mural paintings depict the life of Gautama Buddha and his previous life.

The roofs of Thai temples are often adorned with chofas.

Examples 
Some well-known wats include:

Cambodia

At the end of 2017, there were 4,872 wats with 69,199 Buddhist monks supporting Buddhism in Cambodia. By 2019, it was illustrated that 97.1 percent of the Cambodian population was Buddhist, making Cambodia to be one of the most predominant Buddhist nations in the world. 
 
 Angkor Wat, Siem Reap
 Wat Preah Keo, Phnom Penh
 Wat Botum Vattey, Phnom Penh
 Wat Moha Montrey, Phnom Penh
 Wat Ounalaom, Phnom Penh
 Wat Phnom, Phnom Penh
 Wat Bakan, Pursat

Laos
 Wat Si Saket, Vientiane
 Wat Xieng Thong, Luang Prabang
 Wat Mai Suwannaphumaham, Luang Prabang
 Wat Manorom, Luang Prabang

Malaysia

 Wat Buppharam, Penang
 Wat Chayamangkalaram, Penang
 Wat Chetawan, Selangor
 Wat Phothivihan, Kelantan

Despite having only 3.8 percent Buddhists in Kelantan, the northern Malaysian state of Kelantan has numerous Thai wats.

Singapore

 Wat Ananda
 Wat Palelai

Thailand

 Thailand had 39,883 wats. Three hundred-ten were royal wats, the remainder were private (public). There were 298,580 Thai Buddhist monks, 264,442 of the Maha Nikaya order and 34,138 of the Dhammayuttika Nikaya order. There were 59,587 Buddhist novice monks.

 Wat Suthat, Bangkok
 Wat Benchamabophit (The Marble Temple)
 Wat Ratchanatdaram
 Wat Phra Kaew
 Wat Arun
 Wat Bowonniwet Vihara
 Wat Pho
 Wat Saket
 Wat Phra That Doi Suthep, Chiang Mai
 Wat Chiang Man, Chiang Mai
 Wat Chedi Luang, Chiang Mai
 Wat Phra Singh, Chiang Mai
 Wat Phra That Lampang Luang, Lampang
 Wat Phumin, Nan
 Phra Pathommachedi, Nakhon Pathom
 Wat Pah Nanachat (International Forest Monastery), Ubon Ratchathani

Gallery

Cambodia

Laos

Thailand

Other countries 

 Some Tai Khun monasteries in East Shan State, Myanmar are in wat-style but may be called kyaung, while some may be called wat but in kyaung style.

See also

 Three Refuges
 Five Precepts
 Eight Precepts
 Four Noble Truths
 Noble Eightfold Path
 Pāli Canon
 Samatha & Vipassanā
 Cetiya
 Vassa
 Kathina
 Uposatha
 Patimokkha
 Upasampadā
 Bai Sema
 Ordination hall
 Theravāda Buddhism
 Buddhism in Cambodia
 Buddhism in Laos
 Buddhism in Thailand
 Kyaung, Burmese Monasteries
 Pura, Balinese Hindu temples
 Candi, Hindu-Buddha temples of ancient Indonesia, especially Java

References

 
 
 
Buddhist architecture